Baranagar metro station is a metro railway station off Barrackpore Trunk Road at Dunlop of Baranagar in Kolkata. Presently, this metro station is the tallest metro station of Kolkata (approximately 55 feet). The metro station adjoins the platforms of the Baranagar Road railway station where connections can be made with Indian Railways services. This station is also known as "Swami Vivekananda metro station". The station was inaugurated on 22 February 2021.

History

Then in February 2019, the metro line to the Dakshineswar station was projected to be operational by February 2020. A slightly delayed March 2020 projected operation date was announced in late 2019. And a July 2020 projected operation date was mentioned in February 2020. By June 2019, over 95 percent of the viaduct had been completed for the between Noapara and Dakshineswar and that work had begun on the signalling system and laying of the tracks.

The station

Structure
Baranagar is an elevated metro station & is situated on the Kolkata Metro Line 1 and the Kolkata Metro Line 5.

Station layout

Connections

Train
It is connected with Baranagar Road railway station of Chord link line of Kolkata Suburban Railway .

Bus
This station is connected with B.T. Road and Belghoria Expressway. 
 Bus route numbers 26, 26C, 32A, 34B, 56, 78, 78/1, 79, 81/1, 201, 214, 214A, 222, 230, 234, 234/1, 285, DN2, DN2/1, DN9/1, DN43, DN44, DN46, K4, S159 (Mini), S180 (Mini), S185 (Mini), C28, E32, S11, S15G, S23A, S32, S32A, S57, AC2B, AC20, AC23A, AC50, AC50A, AC54, EB1A etc. serve the station.

Auto
Several auto services are available on B. T. Road towards Sodepur, Dakshineswar, Sinthee.

See also
 List of Kolkata Metro stations

References

External links

 Official website for Kolkata Metro Line 1
 UrbanRail.Net – descriptions of all metro systems in the world, each with a schematic map showing all stations.
 

Baranagar
Kolkata Metro stations
Railway stations in North 24 Parganas district
Railway stations in India opened in 2021